"Everybody Have Fun Tonight" is a song by English new wave band Wang Chung, released as a single from their studio album Mosaic in 1986. Collaboratively written by Jack Hues, Nick Feldman, and Peter Wolf, it reached no. 2 on the US Billboard Hot 100 chart on Christmas 1986 behind "Walk Like an Egyptian" by the Bangles. It also hit No. 1 on the Canada RPM Top 100 Singles chart the week of 17 January 1987. With some different lyrics, the original ballad version of the song was placed on the B-side.

After their break-up in 1991, Wang Chung reunited in 2005 to perform this song on the television show Hit Me, Baby, One More Time.

The song is featured on numerous 1980s compilation albums and still receives some radio airplay across the United States. It has appeared in the "#2s" episode of VH1 Classic's One Hit Wonders series, even though the band is also known for "Let's Go!" and "Dance Hall Days".

Background
Lead vocalist Jack Hues said,

Critical reception
Billboard called it a "self-celebrating dance rocker" that "[coins] a new verb."

Track listing
7" Geffen / 7-28562 (USA)
 "Everybody Have Fun Tonight (edit)"
 "Fun Tonight: The Early Years"

7" Geffen / GEF 13F (UK)
Side one
 "Everybody Have Fun Tonight (edit)"
 "Fun Tonight: The Early Years"

Side two
 "Dance Hall Days"
 "Don't Let Go"

7" Geffen / P-2193 (JPN)
 "Everybody Have Fun Tonight (edit)"
 "Fun Tonight: The Early Years"

12" Geffen / 0-20551 (USA) and  TA 2589 (UK)
Side one
 "Everybody Have Fun Tonight (12 Inches of Fun)" – 6:45
 "Everybody Have Fun Tonight (edit)" – 3:59*

Side two
 "Everybody Dub Tonight" – 6:02*
 "Fun Tonight: The Early Years" – 4:12

*times as indicated on record label (not actual)

12" (Promo) Geffen / PRO-A-2581 (USA)
Side one
 "Everybody Have Fun Tonight (Edit)" – 3:59

Side two
 "Everybody Have Fun Tonight (LP Version)" – 4:47

Music video

The music video, directed by Godley & Creme, features scenes of the band playing in a wood-lined room with very rapid editing between different takes of the same performance. The editing gives the video a somewhat disorienting flip book-like animation style, employing the use of visual jitter. Wang Chung, additional musicians and dancers are seen in several formations throughout the video. They are shown in close portrait and seated along a row of chairs, the seating arrangement of which was changed with each take. Each shot flips through up to four takes of the same shot, with some shots approaching up to 1/25th of a second between edits. The video was banned by the BBC from airing after its premiere due to a medical expert retained by the BBC’s screening committee claiming it could possibly trigger “epileptic fits”.

Other versions
In 2020, Wang Chung released the rewritten version of the song known as "Everybody Stay Safe Tonight" featuring Valerie Day. The rewritten lyrics reflects the ongoing COVID-19 pandemic and the Black Lives Matter movement. It was released on 8 June 2020.

A folk cover of the song was used in the game Wasteland 3 (2020).

Charts

Year-end charts

References

External links
 

Wang Chung (band) songs
1986 songs
1986 singles
1987 singles
Cashbox number-one singles
Music videos directed by Godley and Creme
RPM Top Singles number-one singles
Songs written by Jack Hues
Songs written by Nick Feldman
Geffen Records singles
Songs written by Peter Wolf (producer)